Charles Chauncey (1706–1777) was an English physician, antiquary, and Fellow of the Royal Society.

Life
He was the eldest son of Charles Chauncey, a London citizen, son of Ichabod Chauncey. He went to Benet College, Cambridge, in 1727, and graduated M.B. 1734, M.D. 1739. In 1740 he was elected a fellow of the Royal College of Physicians, and became a censor in 1740; portraits of Samuel Garth and of Richard Mead at the College of Physicians were given by him.

Chauncey was elected Fellow of the Royal Society, on 29 January 1740. His main reputation was as an antiquary and a collector of paintings and prints, coins and books. He died 25 December 1777, and was buried at St Peter's, Cornhill.

Legacy
His brother Nathaniel, also a collector, succeeded to Chauncey's collections. Three sale catalogues, dated 1790, of pictures, coins, and books, were preserved in the British Museum.

Notes

Attribution

1706 births
1777 deaths
18th-century English medical doctors
Antiquarians from London
Fellows of the Royal Society
Alumni of Corpus Christi College, Cambridge
Medical doctors from London